Hans Ott (born February 28, 1930) is a Swiss former ice hockey player who competed for the Swiss national team at the 1956 Winter Olympics in Cortina d'Ampezzo.

References

External links
Hans Ott statistics at Sports-Reference.com

1930 births
Living people
Ice hockey players at the 1956 Winter Olympics
Olympic ice hockey players of Switzerland
Swiss ice hockey right wingers